Kory Kocur (born March 6, 1969) is a Canadian former professional ice hockey right winger. Kory was drafted in the 1st round (17th overall) by the Detroit Red Wings in the 1988 NHL Entry Draft.

Playing career

Kocur rose to prominence playing for the Saskatoon Blades of the Western Hockey League. He showed impressive numbers in the 1987–88 season scoring 71 points in 69 games. The Detroit Red Wings took notice and drafted Kocur in hopes he would follow in the footsteps of his cousin, Joe Kocur. He stayed with the Blades for one more season earning his most impressive numbers to date with 102 points in just 66 games. In 1989 Kocur was brought up to the Adirondack Red Wings of the American Hockey League in hopes that he would continue to produce big numbers. For two years he helped add goals for Adirondack, but never reached the level that the Red Wings organization wanted. In 1991, he was moved to the Fort Wayne Komets of the International Hockey League where he returned to form, albeit on a weaker team. Kocur would return to the Adirondack Red Wings in 1992 for two games before retiring from professional hockey, having never reached the NHL.

Career statistics

See also
List of family relations in the NHL

External links

1969 births
Adirondack Red Wings players
Canadian ice hockey right wingers
Detroit Red Wings draft picks
Fort Wayne Komets players
Ice hockey people from Saskatchewan
Living people
National Hockey League first-round draft picks
Saskatoon Blades players
People from Kelvington, Saskatchewan